Józef Piłsudski University of Physical Education in Warsaw is a public institution of higher learning in Warsaw, Poland.

Named after early 20th century Polish statesman Józef Piłsudski, it was founded in 1929 as the Central Institute for Physical Exercise. During the communist period (1947–1990) it was renamed to Karol Świerczewski Academy of Physical Education (Akademia Wychowania Fizycznego im. gen. broni Karola Świerczewskiego).

Its rector is Bartosz Molik (elected for the 2020–2024 cadence).

Part of the academy is located in Biała Podlaska.

References

External links
Official homepage in English

Józef Piłsudski
Educational institutions established in 1929
Bielany
Sports universities and colleges
Sport in Warsaw
1929 establishments in Poland
Józef Piłsudski University of Physical Education in Warsaw